Patrick McIlvenny (18 November 1900 – after 1931), known as Paddy or Patsy McIlvenny, was an Irish professional footballer who played as a centre forward or centre half.

Early years
Patrick was born in Belfast and attempted to join the War effort in 1917 by signing up for the 4th Battalion of The Royal Irish Rifles. Patrick had claimed to be 18 years old on his application, and was soon found out and dismissed. At age 17, Patrick had his debut with Lisburn Distillery F.C. He did not stay for long and instead played for Falls League team, Highfield

Success with Distillery
He achieved success upon returning to Distillery for the 1922-23 season scoring 15 goals. On 19 May 1923 during a match with Glentoran, Mcilvenny scored a goal with such force that the ball smashed through the netting.

Move to the English League
In May 1924, Patrick accepted a transfer to Cardiff City for a fee of £500. Patrick did not see as much first team action as he had done at Distillery but on 28 February 1925, Patrick is noted as scoring a header against Newcastle United F.C. 
After his time at Cardiff, he moved to Sheffield Wednesday and Northampton Town in the 1920s, and was capped once for Ireland, against Wales on 15 March 1924 in the 1923–24 British Home Championship. He also played domestically for Distillery and in English non-league football for Boston Town and Hinckley United.

Two of his sons, Paddy and Bobby, also played in the Football League.

Later life and death

Patrick settled down and had a new family in the town of Hinckley and had two other sons, John and Peter. A newspaper article from 1 December 1953 states how Patrick wants to make it clear that his son John is not a Scot, and is native to Hinckley as John has recently been signed for Bristol Rovers F.C. Patrick's son John also played for West Bromwich Albion F.C. Patrick died in Coventry in 1955, he had spent his later years as a Millwright.

References

External links

1900 births
Year of death missing
Association footballers from Belfast
Irish association footballers (before 1923)
Pre-1950 IFA international footballers
Association football forwards
Lisburn Distillery F.C. players
Cardiff City F.C. players
Sheffield Wednesday F.C. players
Shelbourne F.C. players
Northampton Town F.C. players
Boston Town F.C. (1920s) players
Hinckley United F.C. players
NIFL Premiership players
English Football League players
Midland Football League players
British Army personnel of World War I
Royal Ulster Rifles soldiers
Child soldiers in World War I